The Bolivian Navy is a branch of the Armed Forces of Bolivia. As of 2008, the Bolivian Navy had approximately 5,000 personnel. Although Bolivia has been landlocked since the War of the Pacific and its 1904 peace treaty, Bolivia established a River and Lake Force in January 1963 under the Ministry of National Defense. It consisted of four boats supplied from the United States and 1,800 personnel recruited largely from the Bolivian Army. The Bolivian Navy was renamed the Bolivian Naval Force in January 1966, but it has since been called the Bolivian Navy as well. It became a separate branch of the armed forces in 1963. Bolivia has large rivers which are tributaries to the Amazon which are patrolled to prevent smuggling and drug trafficking. Bolivia also maintains a naval presence on Lake Titicaca, the highest navigable lake in the world, which the country shares with Peru.

Landlocked Bolivia has not reconciled with the loss of its coast to Chile, and the Navy exists to keep the hope alive of recovering its coast by cultivating a maritime consciousness.

Bolivia claims the country had access to the sea at independence in 1825. In the Boundary Treaty of 1866 between Chile and Bolivia the involved parties agreed on a border line that established a sea access for Bolivia recognized by Chile. In the War of the Pacific (1879–1883) Chile defeated Peru and Bolivia, and conquered the Litoral Department which included all of the Bolivian coastline. The recovery of its coast is a matter of honor in Bolivia, influencing many modern-day political actions and trade decisions.

In 2010, Peru granted Bolivia "dock facilities, a free-trade zone and space for economic activities" along with the option to "build a Pacific Coast annex for the Bolivian navy school" in a 99-year deal.

Organization

The Navy is organized into ten naval districts with flotilla headquarters in Guaqui, Guayaramerín, Puerto Suárez, Riberalta, and San Pedro de Tiquina and bases in Puerto Busch, Puerto Horquilla, Puerto Villarroel, Trinidad, and Rurrenabaque.

Naval vessels include several dozen boats, a dozen or more of which are for riverine patrol. Seagoing vessels, including the American-made PR-51 Santa Cruz de la Sierra and several other vessels sail the oceans with the Bolivian flag with the granted permission of the "Capitanias Navales" Naval Registration Office. The Libertador Simón Bolívar, a ship acquired from Venezuela, used to sail from its home port in Rosario, Argentina on the River Paraná. In 1993 the Navy was formally renamed the Naval Force and moved with the Bolivian Army and Air Force as service branches of the Armed Forces of Bolivia.

Most of the officers attend the Bolivian Naval Academy, graduating with a Bachelor of Science in Military and Naval Science, accredited by the Military University. Many naval officers later go on to further studies at the undergraduate and graduate level. Argentina's Naval Military Group in Bolivia advises on naval strategy and tactics. Many Bolivian officers train in ocean sailing on Argentinian seagoing naval ships.  The Force has several Special Operations units to address both internal and external threats.

The Naval Force covers the extensive Bolivian inland waterways divided between the following Naval Districts which are named after the basin or region where they operate:

DN1 First Naval District "BENI" ——
DN2 Second Naval District "MAMORA" ——
DN3 Third Naval District "MADERA" ——
DN4 Fourth Naval District "TITICACA" ——
DN5 Fifth Naval District "SANTA CRUZ DE LA SIERRA" ——
Sixth Naval District DN6 "COBIJA" ——

The Naval Service Areas:
AN 1 "COCHABAMBA" ——
AN 2 "SANTA CRUZ" ——
AN 3 "BERMEJO" ——
AN 4 "LA PAZ" ——
 Special Operation capable units:
Task Force "Blue Devils" ——
SINDA Naval Intelligence Service of the Bolivian Navy ——
Immediate Response Group GRIN ——
The High Altitude Diving Training Center ——
Command Training Center Amphibians

Marine Corps 

The Marine component of the FNB originated with the creation of the Marine Battalion Almirante Grau in the early 1980s. This force consisted of 600 men based on Tiquina Naval Base on Lake Titicaca. The name was later changed to Marine Battalion Independence, based in Chua Cocani (Not to be confused with the Independence Regiment (RI17) of the Bolivian army).

At present this marines maintain a similar number of troops including paramilitaries. Marine personnel are either part of Task Force Blue Devils or are stationed in various naval bases. There are currently seven infantry battalions which are distributed as follows:

First Naval District "BENI" ——
I Marine Battalion "Bagué" ——
Second Naval District "MAMORA" ——
II Marine Battalion "Tocopilla" ——
Third Naval District "MADERA" ——
III Marine Battalion "Mejillones" ——
Fourth Naval District Titicaca ——
IV Marine Battalion "Alianza" ——
VI Mechanized Marine Battalion "Independence" ——
Fifth Naval District "SANTA CRUZ DE LA SIERRA" ——
V Marine Battalion Calama ——
Sixth Naval District "COBIJA" ——
VII Marine Battalion "Columna Porvenir" ——
National Marine Security Corps

Naval Military Police 
The Policía Militar Naval or PMN is a speciality similar to its counterpart to the Army's Military Police, carrying out operations such as Important Persons Protection (IPP), Physical Security (SEF), or Patrol Facility (PAT) with additional duties such as Signals or naval protocol.  The principal component are four police battalions:

AN 4 "La Paz" —— 4th Naval Area
 1st Naval Police Battalion ——
AN 1 "COCHABAMBA" —— AN 1 "Cochabamba"
2nd Naval Police Battalion "Quiver" ——
AN 2 "SANTA CRUZ"—— AN 2 "SANTA CRUZ"
3rd Naval Police Battalion ——
Fourth Naval District Titicaca ——
4th Naval Police Battalion ——

Alongside the battalions are a number of MP companies in various naval bases.

Current status
Regaining access to the South Pacific Ocean is seen as part of the national narrative for Bolivia. Despite it being part of the national narrative, aspirations to negotiate access to the ocean with Chile ultimately failed following an International Court of Justice ruling. Sailors of the Bolivian Navy yearn for access to the sea and describe its current navy as experiencing locked-in syndrome (enclaustramiento). Despite this, the Bolivian Navy extensively patrols Lake Titicaca and 5,000 miles of navigable rivers, intercepting smugglers, delivering supplies to remote rural areas and rescuing people and livestock during floods. In addition to local duties, the Bolivian Navy trains with the Argentine Navy and has partaken in United Nations peacekeeping operations in Haiti.

Strength

Watercraft

The Bolivian Navy has a total of 173 vessels with many stationed on Lake Titicaca:

Patrol boats:
 1 PR-51 (Santa Cruz de la Sierra) Class 
 6 Capitan Bretel - Type 928 YC 
 4 Lake Class
 38 Boston Whaler Piranha LP

Other ships:
 8 Boston Whaler Piranha LP riverine assault boats Mk.1
 3 Servicio Industrial de la Marina (SIMA)-built Riverine hospital ships / 226 ton Plataforma Intinerante de Accin Social con Sostenibilidad PIASS Itinerant platform
 2 Hydrocarbon transporters
 2 Tankers
 1 Transport vessel 
 1 Training ship (Libertador Simón Bolívar) - based on Simón Bolívar (barque)
 1 55' Hatteras patrol vessel

Naval Infantry
The Bolivian Naval Force retains about 2,000 naval infantry personnel and marines.

Naval Aviation 
, the Bolivian Naval Force retains a Cessna 402 for patrol.

See also
Atacama border dispute
Navies of landlocked countries

Further reading

References

External links
 Bolivian Navy - official website 
 Bolivian Navy from Nations Encyclopedia
 Bolivian Navy Ensign

Navy
Navies by country
Riverine warfare